John Patrick Barry (December 23, 1893 – August 17, 1946) was a Canadian politician and lawyer. Defeating candidates Frances Fish and John Adams Creaghan, he was elected to the House of Commons of Canada in the 1935 election as a Member of the Liberal Party to represent the riding of Northumberland. He was defeated in the 1940 election as an Independent Liberal candidate.

Barry was born in Chatham, New Brunswick, Canada.

References

External links
 

1893 births
1946 deaths
Liberal Party of Canada MPs
Members of the House of Commons of Canada from New Brunswick